Chehalem may refer to:

Geographic
Chehalem Mountains, a mountain range named for a band of the Atfalati people
Chehalem Creek, a tributary of the Willamette River
Chehalem Gap, the former name of Rex, Oregon
Chehalem Mountains AVA, an American Viticultural Area
Chehalem, Oregon, an unincorporated community in Washington County, 4 miles southwest of Sherwood, Oregon
Chehalem, Oregon, a historical name for Newberg, Oregon
Chehalem Valley, the valley formed by Chehalem Creek
West Chehalem, Oregon, a former community in Yamhill County, 5 miles northwest of Newberg, Oregon

Other
Chehalem Airpark, a private airport in Yamhill County
Chehalem blackberry, a cultivar of the blackberry, also known as 'Chehalem'
Chehalem Elementary School in the Beaverton School District 
Chehalem Mountain Heliport, a heliport in Washington County
Chehalem (winery), a winery in the Chehalem Mountains AVA
Chehalem Valley Middle School in the Newberg School District